This is the list of Cork City F.C. seasons since the club's return to League of Ireland Premier Division competition in 2012. It includes European and Cup participation.

League seasons

Key

P = Played
W = Games won
D = Games drawn
L = Games lost
F = Goals for
A = Goals against
Pts = Points
Pos = Final position

League of Ireland Prem = League of Ireland Premier League
League of Ireland Div1 = League of Ireland First Division

1st Qual = 1st Qualifying Round
2nd Qual = 2nd Qualifying Round
3rd Qual = 3rd Qualifying Round
Qual P/O = Qualifying Play Offs
GS = Group Stage
R1 = Round 1
R2 = Round 2
R3 = Round 3
R4 = Round 4
R5 = Round 5
Rof16 = Round of 16
QF = Quarter-finals
SF = Semi-finals
R/U = Runners Up
W= Winners

References

Republic of Ireland association football club seasons
Cork City F.C. seasons